is a Japanese former professional baseball player. He has played in Nippon Professional Baseball (NPB) for the Yokohama DeNA BayStars.

Career
Yokohama DeNA BayStars selected Momose with the sixth selection in the 2014 NPB draft.

On July 31, 2019, Momose made his NPB debut.

On December 15, 2020, Momose announced his retirement.

References 

1997 births
Living people
Baseball people from Nagano Prefecture
Japanese baseball players
Nippon Professional Baseball infielders
People from Matsumoto, Nagano
Yokohama DeNA BayStars players